The Glishorn is a mountain of the Pennine Alps, overlooking Brig-Glis in the canton of Valais.

References

External links
 Glishorn on Hikr

Mountains of the Alps
Mountains of Switzerland
Mountains of Valais
Two-thousanders of Switzerland